CVEDesign, formally Calori & Vanden-Eynden (est. 1982) is a New York City-based firm specializing in environmental graphic design (EGD): signage, wayfinding, placemaking, and user navigation systems within the built environment.

The firm's notable EGD work includes Washington, D.C.'s citywide pedestrian wayfinding system (Washington Post feature); branded signage for Amtrak’s Acela train service, which received a gold IDEA award from the Industrial Designers Society of America (IDSA); signage for New York City’s Second Avenue Subway; signage for the Rock and Roll Hall of Fame and Museum (in partnership with Alexander Isley); and environmental graphics for Planned Parenthood of New York, Cornell University's Stocking Hall, Tecnológico de Monterrey University, and The Riverside Church, among others. The firm's work has also been recognized for excellence by the American Institute of Graphic Arts (AIGA), the American Institute of Architects New York Chapter (AIANY), and the Society for Environmental Graphic Design (SEGD). In 2018 the firm merged with Entro Communications of Toronto, Canada.


Principals 
Chris Calori and David Vanden-Eynden are both Fellows of the Society for Environmental Graphic Design. Calori received the Distinguished Member Award from the SEGD in 2002 for, "demonstrating outstanding volunteer efforts while significantly contributing to the direction, growth, and excellence of SEGD programs." Vanden-Eynden received the Angel Award from the SEGD in 2004 for, "promoting the highest values in EGD and significantly contributing to the direction and growth of the organization."

Calori and Vanden-Eynden each graduated from The Ohio State University (OSU) in Columbus, Ohio, with Calori holding an MA in design planning. Calori received a Distinguished Alumni Award from OSU's Department of Industrial, Interior, and Visual Communication Design in 2008.

References

Selected bibliography
 Calori, Chris and Vanden-Eynden, David. Signage and Wayfinding Design Second Edition. New Jersey: Wiley, 2015
 Calori, Chris. Signage and Wayfinding Design. New Jersey: Wiley, 2007.
 Berger, M. Craig. Wayfinding: Designing and Implementing Graphic Navigational Systems. Mies, Switzerland: A RotoVision Book, 2005. 153, 170–171.
 Shaoqiang, Wang. This Way Please. Beijing, China: Sandu Publishing, 2009.
 Calori & Vanden-Eynden. Public Images: The First 30. New York: Blurb, 2009.
 Guide Sign Graphics: A Collection of Signage for Public, Commercial, Educational, Medical, Corporate, and Exhibition Facilities. Tokyo, Japan: P.I.E. Books, 2006. 81, 123, 223.
 Everyday Diagram Graphics. Tokyo, Japan: P.I.E. Books, 2002. 37.
 Huang Li. ed. “Calori & Vanden-Eynden Design Consultants.” Package and Design, Issue #155, 2009. 4-21.
 Pederson, B. Martin. “Graphics That Bridge a Linguistic Divide.” Metropolismag.com (12 April 2005).
 “Sleek Signs: Acela Station Signage by Calori & Vanden-Eynden / Design Consultants” ArchNewsNow.com (22 July 2002).
 Goldwasser, Amy. "CURRENTS: GRAPHIC ARTS; In This Best of 2000 List, It Isn't What They Say; It's How They Say it." New York Times (7 June 2001).
 Sternlieb, Joseph, and Anne-Marie Bairstow. “All We Wanted Were Directions”. The Washington Post (31 December 2000, Sec. B, pp. 1, 4).
 Wheeler, Linda. “D.C. Visitors Are Promised Elegant Signs to Tourist Sites”. The Washington Post (20 December 2000, Sec. B, pp. 1, 5).
 Pierson, John. “Design Aims to Keep Best Face on Signs”. The Wall Street Journal (14 November 1990, Sec. B, pp. 1).

External links
 Calori & Vanden-Eynden website
 Society for Environmental Graphic Design (SEGD)
 The Ohio State University Department of Industrial, Interior, and Visual Communication Design

Graphic design studios